Lev Gorn (born 1971 in Stavropol) is a Russian-born American stage, film, and television actor. He is best known for his role as KGB officer Arkady Ivanovich Zotov in The Americans. Later, he had a recurring role as Mikhail Vassily Tal in The Enemy Within. Sometimes, he is credited as Lev Gorens.

Early life
Lev Gorn was born in Stavropol, southern Russia, in the former Soviet Union. His family emigrated from the USSR in 1981. Gorn became a naturalized United States citizen in his adulthood.

Stage plays

Off-Broadway
 The Good Steno, as Sm / Mr. Burton / Father
 My Antonia, as Ambrosh
 The Penis Monologue, as Man #1
 Napoli, Brooklyn, as Nic Muscolino

Others
 Cloud 9, as Bagley / Martin (United Kingdom)
 The Crucible, as Francis Nurse (New York City)
 , as King Ferdinand (UK)
 Man Equals Man, as Polly (NYC)
 A Man For All Seasons, as Henry VIII (UK)
 Savages, as Carlos (UK)
 Taming of the Shrew, as Grumio (Michigan)
 What Sprang Off A Gypsie, as Jesco (NYC)

Selected filmography

TV appearances

Video game appearances

Web series appearances

References

External links
 
 Lev Gorn NYC Headshot Photographer 

1971 births
Living people
People from Stavropol
American male film actors
American male television actors
American male stage actors
Russian emigrants to the United States
Soviet emigrants to the United States
People with acquired American citizenship 
20th-century American male actors
21st-century American male actors
American people of Russian-Jewish descent
Soviet Jews
21st-century American Jews